Richard Parry may refer to:

Richard Parry (bishop) (1560–1623), Bishop of St. Asaph
Richard Parry (director) (born 1967), film director
Richard Lloyd Parry (born 1969), British foreign correspondent
Richard Reed Parry (born 1977), musician, member of indie band Arcade Fire
Rick Parry (born 1955), former chief executive of Liverpool F.C.
Dick Parry (born 1942), English saxophonist

See also
Richard Parry-Jones (1951–2021), chief technical officer
Richard Perry (disambiguation)